Tandil is a monotypic genus of South American cribellate araneomorph spiders in the family Dictynidae containing the single species, Tandil nostalgicus. It was first described by Cândido Firmino de Mello-Leitão in 1940, and has only been found in Argentina.

References

External links

Dictynidae
Spiders described in 1940
Spiders of Argentina
Taxa named by Cândido Firmino de Mello-Leitão